HFV may refer to:

 Human foamy virus
 High frequency ventilation, medical ventilation
 Hessian Football Association, Germany